Nicaragua competed at the 2020 Summer Olympics in Tokyo. Originally scheduled to take place from 24 July to 9 August 2020, the Games were postponed to 23 July to 8 August 2021, because of the COVID-19 pandemic. It was the nation's fourteenth appearance at the Summer Olympics, having competed at every Games since 1968 with the exception of the 1988 Summer Olympics in Seoul because of its partial support of the North Korean boycott.

Competitors
The following is the list of number of competitors participating in the Games:

Athletics

Nicaragua received a universality slot from World Athletics to send a male track and field athlete to the Olympics.

Track & road events

Judo

Nicaragua qualified one judoka for the women's heavyweight category (+78 kg) at the Games, signifying the nation's return to the sport for the first time since Atlanta 1996. Izakaya Marenco accepted a continental berth from the Americas as the nation's top-ranked judoka outside of direct qualifying position in the IJF World Ranking List of June 28, 2021.

Rowing

Nicaragua qualified one boat in the men's single sculls for the Games after finishing fourth in the B-final and securing the third of five berths available at the 2021 FISA Americas Olympic Qualification Regatta in Rio de Janeiro, Brazil, marking the country's debut in the sport. An additional slot was awarded to another Nicaraguan rower competing in the women's single sculls, as the nation granted an invitation from the Tripartite Commission and the International Rowing Federation.

Qualification Legend: FA=Final A (medal); FB=Final B (non-medal); FC=Final C (non-medal); FD=Final D (non-medal); FE=Final E (non-medal); FF=Final F (non-medal); SA/B=Semifinals A/B; SC/D=Semifinals C/D; SE/F=Semifinals E/F; QF=Quarterfinals; R=Repechage

Shooting

Nicaragua received an invitation from the Tripartite Commission to send a men's air pistol shooter to the Olympics, as long as the minimum qualifying score (MQS) was fulfilled by June 5, 2021.

Swimming

Nicaragua received a universality invitation from FINA to send two top-ranked swimmers (one per gender) in their respective individual events to the Olympics, based on the FINA Points System of June 28, 2021.

Weightlifting

Nicaragua entered one female weightlifter into the Olympic competition. Sema Nancy Loudrick topped the list of weightlifters from the Americas in the women's 64 kg category based on the IWF Absolute Continental Rankings.

See also
Nicaragua at the 2019 Pan American Games

References

Nations at the 2020 Summer Olympics
2020
2021 in Nicaraguan sport